I-San Special (or Kuen pra chan tem doueng, literally Night of the Full Moon) is a 2002 Thai experimental independent drama film directed by Mingmongkol Sonakul and based on an idea by Apichatpong Weerasethakul. Set aboard a ramshackle inter-city bus traveling from Bangkok to Isan, the audio of a Thai radio soap opera is acted out by the passengers. However, when the bus stops, the drama of the passengers' normal lives is portrayed. Parallels are seen between the soap opera and reality in terms of the characters' social class.

Cast

 Mesini Kaewratri as Phenprapah
 Mark Salmon as Danny
 Phurida Vichitphan as Mathavee
 Suman Thepsatit as Kittichai
 Jennafee as Mali
 Wiwat Pakklong as Noi
 Songsak Sankam as Man
 Uraiwan Phochaitho as Kan
 Patchara Leaosrisuk as Pale woman
 Thaveesak Kenkam as Bus driver
 Satit Kosalak as Drunk man

Reception

Variety = "I-san Special" is a funhouse of fantastical dreams and desires, put across with lots of wit and charm aboard a ramshackle bus. Inasmuch as it's an expansion of an original idea by Apichatpong Weerasethakul ("Blissfully Yours"), it suggests a certain esprit de corps among Thai filmmakers reminiscent of the French New Wave.

Festivals and awards
I-San Special premiered at the Singapore International Film Festival, where it was nominated for a Silver Screen Award and won a special mention FIPRESCI Prize, "For its uncompromising stance and unconventional portrayal of modern Thailand, and the conflations and deconstruction of multiple realities and genres such as the soap opera, the road movie and Thai pop culture." The film was also screened at the Vancouver International Film Festival and the San Francisco International Asian American Film Festival. It received a limited release in Thailand in 2002, but was screened at the 2003 Bangkok International Film Festival.

References

External links 
Official site

2002 films
Thai-language films
2000s avant-garde and experimental films
2002 independent films
Isan
2000s road movies
Thai avant-garde and experimental films
Thai independent films